Forbes March (born May 12, 1973) is a British-born Canadian actor.

Career 
March originally started acting in Vancouver, where he landed his first series, Northwood. He soon started working as a model and did print work for Armani, Tommy H. and Marlboro Clothing.

March's first big acting role was Scott Chandler on the ABC daytime soap opera All My Children in 1999. Paired with new character Becca Tyree (Abigail Spencer), he was written off the series in 2000. March and Spencer soon worked together again on the 2001 independent film Campfire Stories. He next played Jesse Kilmartin on the Canadian science fiction series Mutant X from 2001 until the show's cancellation in 2004. In late July 2005, he returned to daytime television as Nash Brennan on ABC's One Life to Live from July 7, 2005 to July 16, 2008.

From July to November, 2009, March played Mason Jarvis on the daytime drama series As the World Turns. He also appeared in Degrassi Takes Manhattan, a film adaptation of the Canadian television series which was released in 2010.

After leaving As the World Turns, March quit acting and established a new business, the New York Firewood Company. The firm supplies wood for restaurants and private residences in New York City.

Personal life 
March was arrested in March 2023 for siphoning used cooking oil from a storage container at a diner located in Kingston, NY.

Filmography

Film

Television

References

External links

1973 births
Living people
Canadian male soap opera actors
Canadian male television actors
English emigrants to Canada
People from Bristol
Male actors from Halifax, Nova Scotia